Agence et Messageries Aérienne du Zaïre (AMAZ), formerly Agence et Messageries Aérienne du Congo (AMAC), was a Zairean airline. It had its headquarters at Aérodrome de N'Dolo in Kinshasa. The carrier was formed in the 1960s to take over some services flown by Cogeair, and provided feeder services to Air Zaïre. It ceased operations in the late 1970s.

History
The company was established in the 1960s to partly take over the route network operated by Cogeair and to provide services to destinations not served by Air Zaire. In 1971, Cogeair was taken over by the company. At , the carrier had Aztecs, Beech C-45s, DC-3s, Herons and Islanders in operation deployed on a route network that included 20 cities and villages in the country, linked to Goma, Kananga, Kinshasa or Lubumbashi.

By , Agence et Messageries Aérienne du Zaïre was operating an extensive feeder network along the Kinshasa–Lusanga–Idiofa–Ilebo–Kinshasa and Kinshasa–Boma–Moanda–Kinshasa runs that connected with Air Zaïre services, and also linked Kalemie and Moba with Lubumbashi. At this time, the fleet included seven Beech C-45s, four BN-2A Islanders, two de Havilland Herons, three Douglas DC-3s, one Douglas DC-4, one Mitsubishi MU-2G and three Piper Aztecs. These aircraft were also used for charter passenger and cargo flights. At , the fleet consisted of three BN-2A Islanders, two DC-3s, four Douglas DC-4s and one HS.125-400B.

Agence et Messageries Aérienne du Zaïre ceased operations in the late 1970s.

Destinations
Following is a list of destinations served by the carrier throughout its history:

Beni
Boma
Bunia
Idiofa
Ilebo
Kalemie
Kananga
Kinshasa
Lubumbashi
Lusanga
Masi-Manimba
Moanda
Moba

Fleet
Through the years, the carrier operated the following aircraft:

Beech C-45
BN-2A Islander
de Havilland Heron
Douglas DC-3
Douglas DC-4
HS.125
Mitsubishi MU-2G
Piper PA-23 Aztec
Piper PA-25 Pawnee

See also
Transport in the Democratic Republic of the Congo

References

Bibliography

Defunct airlines of the Democratic Republic of the Congo
Companies based in Kinshasa